Sienna Rosie Diana Miller (born December 28, 1981) is an American-born English actress. Born in New York City and raised in London, she began her career as a photography model, appearing in the pages of Italian Vogue and for the 2003 Pirelli calendar. Her acting breakthrough came in the 2004 films Layer Cake and Alfie. She subsequently portrayed socialite Edie Sedgwick in Factory Girl (2006) and author Caitlin Macnamara in The Edge of Love (2008), and was nominated for the 2008 BAFTA Rising Star Award. Her role as The Baroness in G.I. Joe: The Rise of Cobra (2009) was followed by a brief sabbatical from the screen amid increased tabloid scrutiny.

Miller returned to prominence with her role as actress Tippi Hedren in the television film The Girl (2012), for which she was nominated for the BAFTA Television Award for Best Actress and the Golden Globe Award for Best Actress – Miniseries or Television Film. Further critical acclaim followed throughout the 2010s, with appearances in the films  Foxcatcher (2014), American Sniper (2014), Mississippi Grind (2015), The Lost City of Z (2016), Live by Night (2016), and American Woman (2018), as well as the miniseries The Loudest Voice (2019).

Early life
Miller was born in New York City, and moved to London with her family when she was 18 months old. She later boarded at all-girls Heathfield School in Ascot, Berkshire. Her father, Edwin Miller, is an American dealer in Chinese art, previously a banker. Her mother, Josephine, is a British former model who was born in South Africa to British parents and was a personal assistant to David Bowie and one-time manager of the Lee Strasberg Theatre and Film Institute in NYC.

Acting career

Early acting credits, 2001–2003
Miller's screen debut came in the romantic comedy South Kensington (2001), opposite Rupert Everett and Elle Macpherson. In 2002, she had supporting roles in High Speed and its follow-up The Ride, and guest-starred in The American Embassy and Bedtime. She had a regular role as the combative yet caring flatmate of an NYPD detective in the television drama series Keen Eddie (2003). Although FOX canceled it after only seven episodes, it was Miller's first exposure to American audiences.

Breakthrough and tabloid notoriety, 2004–2008
With roles in two commercial films and a higher public profile due to her relationship with actor Jude Law, 2004 was a turning point for Miller's career. The crime thriller Layer Cake, directed by Matthew Vaughn and starring Daniel Craig, featured her as the love interest of a London-based cocaine supplier. The New York Times described Miller as "a new It Girl who barely registers on-screen despite wearing little more than lacey filaments that make her look like a gift meant to be unwrapped very quickly". In Alfie, the remake of Bill Naughton's 1966 film, she played the girlfriend of a cockney limo driver and sex addict (Jude Law). On her new It Girl status, she said at the time: "I'm not very happy about it, to be honest. It makes me uncomfortable because I don't think it's as a result of having a film come out, [but] being scrutinised because of the relationship I'm in".

Miller portrayed a writer of illegal feminist books and the love interest of Giacomo Casanova (Heath Ledger) in the period dramedy Casanova (2005). It made a moderate US$37.6 million, and Entertainment Weekly, in a positive review, wrote: "Ms. Miller has a modern, smart-girl look about her; her Francesca is neither too tough to melt nor too glittering from the Emma Thompson school of smarties". In 2005 she also made her West End debut in a revival of As You Like It at the Wyndhams Theatre, where she received lukewarm reviews. Paul Taylor of The Independent wrote: "She approaches an emotion with the finesse of someone beating a carpet" and that she "brings to it all the ripe professional stage experience that can be mustered from appearing in three movies".

Miller took on the role of 1960s socialite and Andy Warhol's muse Edie Sedgwick in the biographical drama Factory Girl (2006). Johnny Vaughan from Sun Online concluded that "[i]t's Sienna Miller's star that shines brightest in this heartbreaking cautionary tale", but Rotten Tomatoes' critical consensus states: "Despite a dedicated performance by Sienna Miller, Factory Girl delves only superficially into her character, and ultimately fails to tell a coherent story." In 2007, Miller had a role as the love interest of a young man from a fictional British town, in Matthew Vaughn's adaptation Stardust, and played a starlet in Steve Buscemi's Interview, a remake of Dutch filmmaker Theo van Gogh's 2003 movie of the same name. Budgeted at US$65 million, Stardust grossed a modest US$137 million worldwide, while critics felt that Buscemi and Miller's "captivating performances" in Interview made "a seemingly simple premise gripping and entertaining".

In The Mysteries of Pittsburgh (2008), a film adaptation of writer Michael Chabon's novel, Miller played a woman romantically involved with a rebellious bisexual man. It premiered at the Sundance Film Festival and received a limited release. She created a minor stir in Pittsburgh when, in a 2006 interview with Rolling Stone, she referred to the city as "Shitsburgh", saying, "Can you believe this is my life? Will you pity me when you're back in your funky New York apartment and I'm still in Pittsburgh? I need to get more glamorous films and stop with my indie year." Miller was parodied in Pittsburgh media (including one article that was headlined "Semi-famous actress dumps on the 'Burgh") and criticised for making what was seen as an unnecessarily disparaging remark, given the special treatment the film's cast and crew had received from the visitors' bureau and other city offices. Miller apologised and said her remarks were taken out of context.

In The Edge of Love, (2008), a British biographical romantic drama, Miller appeared alongside Keira Knightley as Caitlin Macnamara, the wife of Welsh poet Dylan Thomas. Despite a mixed critical reception, The Hollywood Reporter critic Ray Bennett wrote that it was a "wonderfully atmospheric tale of love and war", and that "the film belongs to the women, with Knightley going from strength to strength (and showing she can sing!) and Miller again proving that she has everything it takes to be a major movie star." Miller earned a BIFA Award nomination for Best Supporting Actress for her performance. She also voiced a circus fox in the animated film A Fox's Tale (2008) and played an undead newlywed in the romantic comedy Camille.

Screen hiatus, 2009–2011

Miller was cast as The Baroness in the live-action film adaptation of the G.I. Joe franchise G.I. Joe: The Rise of Cobra (2009), her first—and to date, only—mainstream Hollywood blockbuster. She auditioned because it did not involve "having a breakdown or [being] addicted to heroin or dying at the end, something that was just maybe really great fun and that people went to see and actually just had a great time seeing." She sprained her wrist after slipping on a rubber bullet while filming a fight scene with Rachel Nichols. G.I. Joe was not well received by most critics, but made US$302.5 million worldwide.

She appeared on the UK motorsport show Top Gear in 2009 on the segment "star in a reasonably priced car" and set a lap time of 1:49.8, having passed her driving test only five days before.

By this point, her skyrocketing career had been driven off-course by her tabloid notoriety. The Independent observed that her professional trajectory reached "its lowest ebb" with G.I. Joe, an experience that "convinced her she had well and truly lost her way"; while in an interview with UK's Esquire magazine, she stated that roles dried up because "people don’t want to see films with people they don’t approve of in them". She opted to take a hiatus from films for the next two years and work in theater instead. She later said, "I was sick of myself, to be honest, or sick of that perception of me. It all felt so f**king dirt".

Miller played the title role in Patrick Marber's 2009 production of After Miss Julie on Broadway. She told The New York Times: "This is what I have always wanted, to be on Broadway. I'm living my dream, and that's all you can ask for. At a certain point, you have to ignore all the rest". On her performance, The Guardian stated: "Miller masters it intermittently—an accomplishment, however incomplete." She starred as a former starlet caught up in a love-triangle in Trevor Nunn's 2011 production of Flare Path at London's Theatre Royal Haymarket. It drew favourable reviews, with Henry Hitchings of Evening Standard writing that Miller "brings to her role just the right mixture of glacial poise and agonised tension". In The Independent, Paul Taylor said: "Her performance as the conflicted actress-heroine is genuinely heart-tugging in the subtle way it communicates this young woman's struggle between patriotic duty and extra-marital desire".

Resurgence, 2012–2017
After her professional slump, Miller experienced what journalists described as a "career revival" She played more complex, dramatic parts in a series of critically acclaimed films. "All the directors speak to each other," she said in an interview. "And once you crack that upper echelon of incredible directors, you've got people rooting for you. People who people listen to. I've never had that before".

In The Girl (2012), an HBO and BBC film, Miller portrayed actress Tippi Hedren, the muse of director Alfred Hitchcock. As part of her research, Miller (who was in the early stages of pregnancy) spoke to Hedren several times during filming, and they became friends. Live birds were used for the rerecreation of the attic scene in Hitchcock's The Birds. Miller told the Radio Times, "I did go through a bird attack for two hours. It pales in comparison to what [Hedren] was subjected to, but it was pretty horrible. There were men off-camera with boxes of birds, throwing seagulls and pigeons in my face". The film received mixed reviews, but the Daily Mirrors Jane Simon wrote: "[G]liding gracefully through it all (and with an impeccable American accent) Sienna Miller brings untouchable beauty and icy glamour, but also captures the extraordinary resilience Hedren must have had to withstand everything Hitchcock threw at her." Writing for The Telegraph, Clive James said "[a] better choice [to play Hedren] could not have been made than Sienna Miller, who is even lovelier than Hedren was". She garnered nominations for the BAFTA Television Award for Best Actress and the Golden Globe Award for Best Actress – Miniseries or Television Film. In 2012, she also played a socialite in the dramedy Two Jacks, the hysterical sister of an elementary teacher in the drama Yellow, and a housewife who aspires to complete in a belly-dance competition in the made-for-television film Just like a Woman.

In 2014, Miller portrayed Nancy Schultz, the wife of murdered Olympic gold medal-winning wrestler Dave Schultz, in Bennett Miller's Foxcatcher as well as Taya Renae Kyle, the wife of United States Navy SEAL sniper Chris Kyle in Clint Eastwood's American Sniper. While both films were highly acclaimed, American Sniper emerged as the highest-grossing war film of all time. In 2015, she took on the roles of a prostitute in the road drama Mississippi Grind, the former boss of a hard-working small business owner in the comedy Unfinished Business, a single mother in the dystopian film High-Rise, and that of a sous-chef in the drama Burnt, which reunited her with Bradley Cooper. For High-Rise, she received a BIFA Award nomination for Best Supporting Actress. Miller also took over the role of Sally Bowles in the Broadway revival of Cabaret after Emma Stone's scheduled departure from the production and performed for the last six weeks of the show's engagement, between February and March 2015. New York Daily News praised her "cocky and steely" performance and felt  that her approach to the role "works well in the Kander and Ebb songs "Don't Tell Momma" and "Perfectly Marvelous"." She was selected to be on the jury for the main competition section of the 2015 Cannes Film Festival.

Miller appeared in Paramount Pictures and Plan B Entertainment's adaptation of The Lost City of Z (2016), directed by James Gray, portraying Nina Fawcett, the wife of British geographer Percy Fawcett. The New York Times found her to be "wonderful" in her role, while Time described her as "luminous and astute". In Ben Affleck's period crime drama Live by Night (also 2016), Miller played the mistress of a notorious gangster and the love interest of a World War I veteran. In 2017, Miller starred in the drama The Private Life of a Modern Woman, which was screened out of competition at the 74th Venice International Film Festival, and in a West End production of the Tennessee Williams classic Cat On A Hot Tin Roof, at the Apollo Theatre.

Continued acclaim, 2018–present
In 2018, Miller appeared in the war film The Catcher Was a Spy as Estella, the girlfriend of Moe Berg, a catcher for the Boston Red Sox who joined the OSS during World War II, as well as the drama American Woman, in which she portrayed a single mother who is faced with raising her grandson after her daughter goes missing under mysterious circumstances. American Woman, which gave Miller some of the best reviews of her career, was her first role as the main character not bolstered by any other actors, and marked the first time she was able to delve into a woman character's life in "nuanced ways". Miller remarked: "These opportunities have been few and far between, and that's intrinsic to being a woman in film. I think it's quite rare; not necessarily specific to me, but at 37 years old, I'm thrilled I’ve had this opportunity. I've done good supporting work in fantastic films and had to work very hard to show something in smaller moments. I loved being able to have the space and time to really do everything I want to with a character".

Miller starred as a narcotics detective in the action film 21 Bridges (2019), alongside Chadwick Boseman. The Guardian felt that the actress was "vocally channelling Edie Falco from The Sopranos", and with a worldwide gross of US$50 million, the film emerged as a moderate commercial success. She next took on the role of Beth Ailes, the wife of television executive Roger Ailes (played by Russell Crowe), in the miniseries The Loudest Voice (also 2019), which aired on Showtime. Miller struggled to find materials on which to base her performance, aside from the script and Gabriel Sherman’s book The Loudest Voice in the Room. During an interview with Entertainment Weekly, she said: "There's very little footage of her that I had access to. But there were these two speeches which she gave, which were on YouTube, and another little interview, so I really kind of based my research around that, and relied on the script because there's just not a lot of information on her out there. But the interview and the speeches I found really revealing".

Other endeavours

Modelling
Before her professional acting career, Miller worked as a photography model. She signed with Tandy Anderson of Select Model Management London, and modelled for Coca-Cola, Italian Vogue, and posed topless in the 2003 Pirelli Calendar. She went on to grace the covers of Vogue'''s American, British, Australian and Portuguese editions, as well as other international fashion magazines such as Nylon, Marie Claire, and Porter Edit.

Miller signed a two-year contract with Madrid-based denim label Pepe Jeans London. The first ad campaign appeared on magazines in March 2006 and was shot by photographer Mikael Jansson and stylist Karl Templer. In February 2009, Hugo Boss Fragrances announced that she would be the new ambassador for their BOSS Orange women's perfume. In March 2016, she announced as the new face of Swedish fashion chain Lindex, starring in the 1970s-inspired Sienna Hearts Lindex spring campaign. Miller appeared as a guest at a Rome retro-styled dinner party in Gucci's Cruise 2020 campaign, which was directed and photographed by American film director Harmony Korine.

Fashion design
In 2007, Miller, along with her sister Savannah, a professional fashion designer, launched a complete fashion label. Called Twenty8Twelve, it gets its name from Miller's date of birth and is financially backed by Pepe Jeans. The sisters remained at the helm of the label until 2012 when they announced they were stepping down as co-creative directors.

Charity
Miller is the Global Ambassador for the International Medical Corps. She travelled with them to the Democratic Republic of the Congo in April 2009 and kept a blog about her experiences. She also visited Haiti with the group after the 2010 Haiti earthquake. Miller also worked alongside Global Cool during their 2007 eco-friendly campaign.

Miller is an ambassador for the UK branch of the Starlight Children's Foundation, which works with seriously ill children and their parents. On 1 July 2007, Miller appeared as a speaker at the Concert for Diana held at Wembley Stadium, London to celebrate the life of Princess Diana almost 10 years after her death. Proceeds from the concert went to Diana's charities as well as to charities of which her sons Princes William and Harry are patrons.Diana concert a 'perfect tribute'. BBC News. Retrieved 18 June 2016

Public image
Her relationship with – and, for a time, engagement to – actor Jude Law, after they had starred together in the 2004 film Alfie, brought both her and her style of dress to the media headlines in the mid 2000s. In December 2004, Vogue featured Miller on its front cover and described her as "the girl of the year".

Dubbed by some publications as "the new Kate Moss", Miller has been closely associated with the style of fashion that became known as boho chic, and is sometimes credited for bringing it into the mainstream. In advertisements for Chloé in early 2005, for instance, she was shown as if casually shopping, while she told Vogue that she had a laid-back approach to grooming, including cutting her own hair. Miller herself has adopted other styles of dress and her shorter, bobbed hairstyle – a feature of bohemian fashion in the 1920s – helped to define a new trend in 2007.Vogue, January 2007

Throughout the 2000s, Miller gradually became much better known for her tabloid persona and her fashion sense than her professional work. As noted by The Independent, "she was one of the most famous young actresses of her generation, but still boasted precious little credibility in the industry". She was frequently photographed by paparazzi topless, and occasionally fully nude, at public pools and beaches. Her 2008 affair with married actor Balthazar Getty caused a hit to Miller's popularity. The North American media labelled Miller a "home-wrecker", while in the UK her perceived capacity for hopping from one relationship to the next earned her the nickname "Serial Miller". Aware of the damage the negative publicity imposed on her career, she said to GQ Magazine, "I probably seem like not a particularly nice person, not a girl's girl," but she defended her behaviour as part of the normal experience of growing up. "I think if you put a camera in anyone's life and document it daily for six years, from the age of 21 to 27, there are going to be things that aren't always pretty".

Her 2010s career resurgence marked a turnabout in Miller's public image as audiences started to take her seriously as an actress. In an interview with The Sydney Morning Herald, she stated: "I definitely feel like I'm in a place now where people are more focused on my career than on my private life and clothes, which is refreshing. There's not the same drama around me that there was".

Throughout her career, Miller has appeared in several magazines' lists of the world's most beautiful women. She ranked 48th, 46th, 11th, 27th, and 51st in Maxim magazine's Hot 100 Women in 2005, 2006, 2007, 2008, and 2009 respectively. She ranked 86th and 2nd in Askmen's top 99 "most desirable" women lists of 2005 and 2006. She was also 63rd in FHM magazine's "100 Sexiest Women in the World" 2006 supplement. From 2004 to 2010, Miller was chosen as one of the "most beautiful famous faces" by The Annual Independent Critics List of the 100 Most Beautiful Famous Faces From Around the World.

Personal life
Relationships
On Christmas Day 2004, Miller became engaged to her Alfie co-star Jude Law. On 8 July 2005, Law issued a public apology to Miller for having an affair with the nanny of his children.  After attempting to salvage their relationship, Miller and Law separated in November 2006. In December 2009, it was reported that Law and Miller had rekindled their relationship after starring in separate shows on Broadway in late 2009. They spent Christmas 2009 in Barbados, along with three of Law's children. They announced they had split again in February 2011.

In 2008, Miller had a highly publicised affair with married actor Balthazar Getty. Miller later sued two British tabloids over the publication of photos showing her and Getty together.

From 2011 to 2015, Miller dated actor Tom Sturridge, with whom she has a daughter, who was born on 7 July 2012.

Phone hacking scandal

Following a High Court hearing in May 2011, Sienna Miller was awarded £100,000 in damages from News of the World after the newspaper admitted hacking into her phone. Later, as a core participant, she gave evidence to the Leveson Inquiry in November 2011, including the following:

In November 2021, Miller accepted "a major financial settlement" from News Group Newspapers, publishers of The Sun, over an alleged phone hacking claim. Her lawyers told the court the payout is "tantamount" to an admission of illegal activity by The Sun. Outside the High Court on 9 December 2021, Miller said about The Sun'' newspaper, "They very nearly ruined my life. I have certainly seen how they have ruined the lives of others."

Filmography

Film

Television

Theatre

Awards and nominations

References

External links

 
 
 
 
 Twenty8Twelve.com Miller's fashion line website

Living people
1981 births
21st-century American actresses
21st-century American women
21st-century British actresses
21st-century British people
21st-century British women
Actresses from London
Actresses from New York City
British fashion designers
British film actresses
British stage actresses
British television actresses
British voice actresses
British people of American descent
British people of South African descent
American fashion designers
American film actresses
American stage actresses
American television actresses
American voice actresses
American people of British descent
American people of South African descent
Lee Strasberg Theatre and Film Institute alumni
People educated at Francis Holland School
People educated at Heathfield School, Ascot
Select Model Management models